Dogfight: 80 Years of Aerial Warfare is a combat flight simulator video game developed by Vektor Grafix (originally as Air Glory) and published by MicroProse in 1993 for the PC DOS, Atari ST and Amiga. In North America, the game was released with the title Air Duel: 80 Years of Dogfighting.

Gameplay

The game features simulation of aerial combat starting from World War I biplanes, through to modern fighter jets.

Reception
Computer Gaming World in 1993 criticized Air Duels framerate, "generic and unrealistic" avionics, lack of Constantly Computed Impact Point, buggy AI, and low replay value. The magazine stated that it would have been better received in 1991, concluding that "Air Duel isn't bad, but it certainly isn't new or better." In a 1994 survey of wargames the magazine gave the title two stars out of five, stating that aircraft "do not seem historically correct ... A great idea with mediocre execution".

References

External links

1993 video games
Amiga games
Atari ST games
DOS games
Combat flight simulators
Falklands War video games
Korean War video games
MicroProse games
Vietnam War video games
World War I flight simulation video games
World War II flight simulation video games
Video games developed in the United Kingdom
Video games scored by John Broomhall